AFI's 10 Top 10 honors the ten greatest American films in ten classic film genres. Presented by the American Film Institute (AFI), the lists were unveiled on a television special broadcast by CBS on June 17, 2008. In the special, various actors and directors, among them Clint Eastwood, Quentin Tarantino, Kirk Douglas, Harrison Ford, Martin Scorsese, Steven Spielberg, George Lucas, Roman Polanski, and Jane Fonda, discussed their admiration for and personal contributions to the films cited.

The entire list of 500 nominated films is available on the American Film Institute website.

To date, this is the final program in AFI's countdown specials.

Animation
AFI defines "animation" as a genre where the film's images are primarily created by computer or hand and the characters are voiced by actors. Nine of the films are Disney properties, including two collaborative works with Pixar, with the only non-Disney selection being DreamWorks Animation's Shrek.

Courtroom drama
AFI defines "courtroom drama" as a genre of film in which a system of justice plays a critical role in the film's narrative.

Epic
AFI defines "epic" as a genre of large-scale films set in a cinematic interpretation of the past.

Fantasy
AFI defines "fantasy" as a genre in which live-action characters inhabit imagined settings and/or experience situations that transcend the rules of the natural world.

Gangster
AFI defines the "gangster film" as a genre that centers on organized crime or maverick criminals in a modern setting.

Mystery
AFI defines "mystery" as a genre that revolves around the solution of a crime.

Romantic comedy
AFI defines "romantic comedy" as a genre in which the development of a romance leads to comic situations.

Science fiction
AFI defines "science fiction" as a genre that marries a scientific or technological premise with imaginative speculation.

Sports
AFI defines "sports" as a genre of films with protagonists who play athletics or other games of competition.

Western
AFI defines "western" as a genre of films set in the American West that embodies the spirit, the struggle, and the demise of the new frontier.

References

External links
 AFI's 10 Top 10
 Official playlist on YouTube
 Filmsite

AFI 100 Years... series
CBS original programming
Centennial anniversaries
Cinema of the United States